Yevgeniy Vasilyevich Mironov (born 1 November 1949) was a Soviet athlete who competed mainly in the Shot Put. He trained at Burevestnik in Leningrad.

He competed for the USSR in the 1976 Summer Olympics held in Montreal, Canada in the Shot Put where he won the silver medal.

References

Sports Reference

1949 births
Living people
Russian male shot putters
Soviet male shot putters
Olympic silver medalists for the Soviet Union
Athletes (track and field) at the 1976 Summer Olympics
Olympic athletes of the Soviet Union
Burevestnik (sports society) athletes
European Athletics Championships medalists
Medalists at the 1976 Summer Olympics
Olympic silver medalists in athletics (track and field)